Bill Ives (1896-1975) was an Australian rugby league footballer who played in the 1920s.

Playing career
Ives played for the Glebe in 1920, Eastern Suburbs between 1921-1927 and the St. George Dragons 1928 in the New South Wales Rugby Football League premiership in Australia. His usual position was at prop-forward. He won one premiership with Eastern Suburbs in 1923.  He captained the club on many occasions.

He was the younger brother of Australian test player Clarrie Ives.

He also played first-class cricket for New South Wales as a right-handed lower-order batsman and a right-arm fast-medium bowler, appearing in seven matches between 1919–20 and 1921–22.

See also
 List of New South Wales representative cricketers

References

1896 births
1975 deaths
Australian rugby league players
New South Wales rugby league team players
Glebe rugby league players
Sydney Roosters players
Sydney Roosters captains
St. George Dragons players
New South Wales cricketers
Rugby league props
Rugby league players from Sydney